was a Japanese special effects director, cinematographer, and optical photographer.

Filmography

Director 

 Monster Planet of Godzilla (1994)
The God of Clay (2011)

Special effects director
 Sayonara Jupiter (1984)
 Gunhed (1989)
 Godzilla vs. Biollante (1989)
 Godzilla vs. King Ghidorah (1991)
 Godzilla vs. Mothra (1992)
 Godzilla vs. Mechagodzilla II (1993)
 Godzilla vs. SpaceGodzilla (1994)
 Yamato Takeru (1994)
 Godzilla vs. Destoroyah (1995)
 Rebirth of Mothra (1996)
 Rebirth of Mothra II (1997)

Special effects assistant director
 Godzilla vs. Hedorah (1971)
 Godzilla vs. Mechagodzilla (1974)
 The War in Space (1977)
 The Mighty Peking Man (1977)

Actor
 Godzilla vs. Hedorah (1971) - Bar Patron (uncredited)
 Godzilla vs. King Ghidorah (1991) - Underground shopping center patron (uncredited)
 Godzilla vs. Mechagodzilla II (1993) - Rodan hand puppet (uncredited)
 Godzilla, Mothra and King Ghidorah: Giant Monsters All-Out Attack (2001) - Minor Role (SDF officer) (final film role)

References

External links
http://www.tohokingdom.com/people/koichi_kawakita.htm
 Milner, David. Yohihiko Shibata (trans.) December 1994. "An Interview with Koichi Kawakita", Kaiju Fan Online. (Originally published in Cult Movies)

1942 births
2014 deaths
Tokusatsu
Special effects people
People from Tokyo